Takin' Place is a 2015 observational documentary film by Cyrus Dowlatshahi about daily life in the Englewood and Washington Park neighborhoods of Chicago's South side.

References

External links
Official website

2015 films
Documentary films about Chicago
2010s English-language films